Crime and Punishment is a legal simulation developed by Imagic and published for the Apple II and  Commodore 64 in 1984. Mindscape published a DOS port.

Gameplay
The player assumed the role of a sentencing judge in a criminal law matter before the courts.

Information available to the player included details on the nature of the crime committed, the defendants prior criminal history and pre-sentencing reports.

The player could also review known facts relating to the case before sentencing the prisoner to probation, jail, prison or even choose the death penalty in murder cases.

In the case of imprisonment, the player also chose the length of prison term.

Scoring was related to how closely the sentence handed out by the player matched that of what a real life judge decided in the case; the player was penalized for asking irrelevant questions.

On pirated editions, the game had only one kind of case, software piracy, and the only available sentence was death.

References

External links
Crime and Punishment at GameFAQs
Crime and Punishment at Gamebase 64.
Images of package and manual

1984 video games
Apple II games
Commodore 64 games
Criminal law video games
DOS games
Mindscape games
Social simulation video games
Video games developed in the United States
Single-player video games
Imagic games